Founded following the resolution passed by the Municipal Council Board of Venice on March 3, 2008, the Fondazione Musei Civici di Venezia (MUVE) manages and develops the cultural and artistic heritage of Venice and islands. Formed as a participatory foundation, it has only one founding member, the City of Venice.

Museums 
 Doge's Palace
 Museo Correr
 Clock Tower
 Ca' Rezzonico
 Palazzo Mocenigo Museum
 Carlo Goldoni's House
 Ca' Pesaro
 Palazzo Fortuny
 Glass Museum
 Lace Museum
 Natural History Museum

References

External links 
 

2008 establishments in Italy
Culture in Venice
Museum organizations
Musei Civici di Venezia
Organisations based in Venice
Organizations established in 2008